Kapuso Mo, Jessica Soho (International title: One at Heart, Jessica Soho / ), also known as KMJS, is a Philippine television news magazine show broadcast by GMA Network. Hosted by Jessica Soho, it premiered on November 7, 2004 on the network's Sunday evening line up.

Premise

The show features stories on events, pop culture, foods, celebrities, health and trends, as well as urban legends, ghost stories and supposed paranormal activities.

Accolades

References

External links
 
 
 

2004 Philippine television series debuts
Filipino-language television shows
GMA Network original programming
GMA Integrated News and Public Affairs shows
Philippine documentary television series